The Wichita Engineering TG-10 was a proposed American training glider conceived by Wichita Engineering in the early 1940s.

Design and development
The TG-10 was designed as a two-seat training glider with a side-by-side cockpit configuration. One aircraft was ordered on 25 June 1942 with the serial 42-57197. However, the contract was cancelled on 1 March 1943 before the aircraft was completed.

Specifications

See also

References

External links

1940s United States sailplanes
Glider aircraft
Mid-wing aircraft